Llewellyn Watts III (1922–2003) was a baseball player and coach in the United States.  He played professionally as a pitcher for the St. Louis Browns organization and wrote a book titled The Fine Art of Baseball that was published in 1964.

Watts completed two seasons of play in the minor leagues before pitching for the Browns.  He later became a baseball coach, and teacher.  He was coach and mentor to Major League players Erik Hanson and Brian Meyer.

Before playing baseball professionally, Watts served aboard the  during World War II for the United States Navy.

References 

1922 births
2003 deaths
United States Navy sailors